Sebastián Rodrigo Martínez Aguirre (born April 11, 1983) is a Uruguayan professional footballer who plays as a centre-back for Colegiales in Argentina.

Career

Sud America
Martinez started his career with Sud América in 2001. He spent three years with the club.

Plaza Colonica
In 2004, Martinez moved to Plaza Colonia for an undisclosed fee. He spent about a year with the club, playing in 19 matches in the league.

Cerro
In January 2005, Martinez moved to C.A. Cerro. In four years with the club, he made 72 league appearances, scoring twice and winning the Uruguayan Segunda División in 2006.

Godoy Cruz
In January 2009, Martinez was loaned out to Godoy Cruz. The loan lasted about a year and a half, in which Martinez made 29 appearances in the league, scoring once.

Quilmes
In the summer of 2010, Martinez was sold to Quilmes on a free transfer. He spent five years at the club, making 99 appearances and sticking with them through relegation in the 2010-11 season, and helping them to promotion in the 2011-12 season.

Newell's
In February 2015, Martinez left Quilmes for Newell's. He couldn't really make an impact for them, and he only made three league appearances in the half-season he spent there.

Atletico Rafaela
In July 2015, Martinez moved to Atletico Rafaela. He made 15 appearances in the 15–16 season.

Argentinos Jrs.
In the summer of 2016, Martinez moved again, this time to Argentinos Juniors. In his debut season, Martinez made 26 appearances, scoring once, and helped his side to promotion to the Argentine Primera División.

Deportivo Moron
In the 2018 winter transfer window, Martinez was loaned out to Deportivo Moron.

Honors
 C.A. Cerro 2006 (Torneo Apertura Uruguayan Segunda División)
 Argentinos Juniors 2016-17 Primera B Nacional

References

External links
 
 

1983 births
Living people
Uruguayan footballers
Uruguayan expatriate footballers
Association football defenders
Liverpool F.C. (Montevideo) players
Sud América players
Plaza Colonia players
C.A. Cerro players
Quilmes Atlético Club footballers
Godoy Cruz Antonio Tomba footballers
Atlético de Rafaela footballers
Newell's Old Boys footballers
Argentinos Juniors footballers
All Boys footballers
Club Atlético Colegiales (Argentina) players
Uruguayan Primera División players
Argentine Primera División players
Primera Nacional players
Uruguayan expatriate sportspeople in Argentina
Expatriate footballers in Argentina